Rolim may refer to:

Rolim Amaro (1942–2001), aka "Comandante Rolim," Brazilian pilot, airline owner, founder of TAM Airlines
Daniel Rolim Oliveira (born 1985), Brazilian rally driver
Francisco Rolim, captain-general of Portuguese Cape Verde, from 3 April 1622 until his death a few months later
Yann Rolim (born 1995), Brazilian professional footballer

See also
Rolim Adolfo Amaro Airport or Jundiaí Airport (IATA: QDV, ICAO: SBJD), the airport serving Jundiaí, Brazil
Rolim de Moura, municipality located in the Brazilian state of Rondônia